Liberator is a ska band originating from the city of Malmö in the Scania region in the south of Sweden. They started in 1994 and released their most recent album in 2009. Currently they are signed to Burning Heart Records.

Discography

Albums
This Is Liberator (1996, Burning Heart)
Worldwide Delivery (1998, Burning Heart; 2000 Epitaph (US release))
Too Much of Everything (2000, Burning Heart)
Soundchecks 95-00 (2001, Burning Heart)
Are You Liberated? (2003)
Stand and Deliver (2009)

Singles and EPs
Freedom Fighters EP (1996, Burning Heart)
"Tell Me Tell Me" (1996, Burning Heart)
Carefully Blended EP (1997, Burning Heart)
"Kick the Bucket" (1998, Burning Heart; 1998 Heartcore (US release))
"Christina" (1998, Burning Heart)
"Everybody Wants It All" (2000, Burning Heart)
"Ring the Alarm" (2008, Bale Records Inc.)

Lineup
Robert Ylipää
Johan Holmberg 
Rodrigo López
Per Hedberg 
Erik Wesser 
Daniel Mattisson
Peter Andersson 
Andreas Sjögren

Sources

Band bio @ Burning Heart

Swedish ska groups
Burning Heart Records artists